In mathematics, there are two natural interpretations of the place-permutation action of symmetric groups, in which the group elements act on positions or places. Each may be regarded as either a left or a right action, depending on the order in which one chooses to compose permutations. There are just two interpretations of the meaning of "acting by a permutation " but these lead to four variations, depending whether maps are written on the left or right of their arguments. The presence of so many variations often leads to confusion.  When regarding the group algebra of a symmetric group as a diagram algebra it is natural to write maps on the right so as to compute compositions of diagrams from left to right.

Maps written on the left 

First we assume that maps are written on the left of their arguments, so that compositions take place from right to left. Let  be the symmetric group on  letters, with compositions computed from right to left.

Imagine a situation in which elements of  act on the “places” (i.e., positions) of something. The places could be vertices of a regular polygon of  sides, the tensor positions of a simple tensor, or even the inputs of a polynomial of  variables. In short, we can regard our items as a word  of length  in which the position of each element is significant. Now what does it mean to act by “place-permutation” on ? There are two possible answers:

 an element  can move the item in the th place to the th place, or
 it can do the opposite, moving an item from the th place to the th place.

Thus, when encountering an instance of a "place-permutation" action one must take care to determine from the context which interpretation is intended, if the author does not give specific formulas.

Consider the first interpretation. The following descriptions are all equivalent ways to describe the rule for the first interpretation of the action:

 For each , move the item in the th place to the th place.
 For each , move the item in the th place to the th place.
 For each , replace the item in the th position by the one that was in the th place.

This action may be written as the rule .

Now if we act on this by another permutation  then we need to first relabel the items by writing . Then  takes this to  This proves that the action is a left action: .

The following descriptions of the second interpretation are all equivalent:

 For each , move the item in the th place to the th place.
 For each , move the item in the th place to the th place.
 For each , replace the item in the th position by the one that was in the th place.

This action may be written as the rule .

In order to act on this by another permutation , again we first relabel the items by writing . Then the action of  takes this to  This proves that our second interpretation of the action is a right action: 
.

Example 

So .

So .

Maps written on the right 

Sometimes people like to write maps on the right of their arguments. This is a convenient convention to adopt when working with symmetric groups as diagram algebras, for instance, since then one may read compositions from left to right instead of from right to left. The question is: how does this affect the two interpretations of the place-permutation action of a symmetric group?

The answer is simple. By writing maps on the right instead of on the left we are reversing the order of composition, so in effect we replace  by its opposite group . This is the same group, but the order of compositions is reversed.

Reversing the order of compositions evidently changes left actions into right ones, and vice versa, changes right actions into left ones. This means that our first interpretation becomes a right action while the second becomes a left one.

In symbols, this means that the action  is now a right action, while the action  is now a left action.

Example 

We let  be the 3-cycle  and  the transposition , as before. So .

So .

Summary 

In conclusion, we summarize the four possibilities considered in this article. Here are the four variations:

Although there are four variations, there are still only two different ways of acting; the four variations arise from the choice of writing maps on the left or right, a choice which is purely a matter of convention.

Notes

References

 Tom Halverson and Arun Ram, "Partition algebras", European J. Combin. 26 (2005), no. 6, 869–921. 
 Thomas Hungerford, Algebra. Springer Lecture Notes 73, Springer-Verlag 1974.
 Gordon D. James, The Representation Theory of the Symmetric Groups. Lecture Notes in Math. 682 (1978), Springer.
 Hermann Weyl, The Classical Groups: Their Invariants and Representations. Princeton University Press, Princeton, N.J., 1939.

Permutations